The IHF Wheelchair Handball World Championship is the official competition for senior national Wheelchair handball teams of the world.

History
In 2013 was already held a Wheelchair Handball World Championship organised by Brazil. But not officially recognized by the IHF. Brazil won all categories.

Since 2015 there exists the European Wheelchair Handball Nations’ Tournament.

On 26 October 2019 the first  Meeting of IHF Wheelchair Handball Working Group was held. They planned the first Wheelchair Handball World Championship for 2021 during the 2021 World Women's Handball Championship.

During the IHF Council Meeting No. 6 on 27 and 28 February 2020 in Cairo the IHF announced that there will be the first Wheelchair Handball World Championship already in 2020. The IHF will add Wheelchair handball for the 2028 Summer Paralympics. But one of the requirement is that there were two world championships until 2022.

Tournaments

6×6

4×4

Statistics

Total hosts

Literature

References

See also
Wheelchair handball
European Wheelchair Handball Nations' Tournament
Pan American Wheelchair Handball Championship

 
Recurring sporting events established in 2020
Wheelchair
World
Wheelchair handball
Parasports world championships